is a Japanese short track speed skater. She competed in the 2018 Winter Olympics.

References

1990 births
Living people
Japanese female short track speed skaters
Olympic short track speed skaters of Japan
Short track speed skaters at the 2018 Winter Olympics
Short track speed skaters at the 2022 Winter Olympics
Competitors at the 2015 Winter Universiade
21st-century Japanese women